Şêx Şemsedînê Qutbê Exlatî or Xelwetî (born in Ahlat; 1558–1674) was a Kurdish mutesewwif, poet, and Sheikh of the Xelwetî tariqa. He wrote in Kurmanji. Despite not being as well known as his contemporaries Melayê Cizîrî and Feqiyê Teyran, his place in Kurdish literature has been deemed important.

Biography 
Exlatî was born in Ahlat near Bitlis in 1558 to an intellectual family. He studied in the Ahlat but also travelled around to study under the guidance of teachers as well. Due to the Ottoman–Safavid War, he settled among the Doskî tribe in the northern part of the Oremar mountain, but in 1620, he moved to Amadiya in Bahdinan with his brother. In Amadiya, he met the local ruler Sîdî Xan from the Ertuşî tribe, who asked him to settle in Birîfkanî to spread his Sufi beliefs after he became aware of his knowledge on religion. Sîdî Xan gave Xelatî seven homes who agreed to settle in the village. In Birfîkanî, Exlatî began spreading his religious beliefs which would be known as Xelwetî until his death in 1674. He died in Birîfkani, having lived a modest life. He had five sons.

Poetry 
Exlatî wrote in a complex Kurmanji, filled with 'closed' expressions. His main topics were sufi metaphysics, rural life and nature.

Notes

Bibliography 
 
 
 
 
 

1558 births
1674 deaths
Kurdish poets
People from Ahlat
Kurdish Sufis
Kurdish Sufi religious leaders
16th-century Kurdish people
17th-century Kurdish people